Christopher or Chris Davies may refer to:

 Chris Davies (Liberal Democrat politician) (born 1954), UK politician
 Chris Davies (Conservative politician) (born 1967), Conservative MP for Brecon and Radnorshire, 2015–19
 Christopher Davies (sailor) (born 1946), British sailor
 Christopher Davies (Australian cricketer) (born 1978), Australian cricketer
 Christopher Davies (South African cricketer) (1952–2002), South African cricketer
 Chris Davies (New Zealand cricketer) (born 1980), New Zealand cricketer
 Chris Davies (footballer) (born 1985), English football coach
 Chris Davies (rugby league) (born 1991), Welsh rugby league footballer

See also 
Chris Davis (disambiguation)